The Tapering darkling beetles (Hymatismus) are an Afrotropical genus of darkling beetles (Tenebrionidae). They are elongate or oval-shaped, with pointed abdomens and protruding eyes. The elytra show longitudinal bands, and like the head and pronotum, are covered with unevenly distributed yellow hairs. They are lethargic scavengers occupying a catholic range of habitats.

Species include:
Hymatismus villosus Haag-Rutenberg, 1870

References

Pimeliinae
Tenebrionidae genera
Arthropods of Africa